Willem Hendrik "Butch" van Breda Kolff (October 28, 1922August 22, 2007) was an American basketball player and coach.

Biography

Early life and career

Butch was born in Glen Ridge, New Jersey, son of Dutch soccer player Jan van Breda Kolff. He gained an affection for basketball while growing up in Montclair. He attended The Hill School in Pottstown, Pennsylvania. He then attended Princeton University, where he played basketball for Franklin "Cappy" Cappon, and New York University, where he also played basketball.

Signed by the New York Knicks in 1946, he spent four seasons playing as a professional. The New York Knicks played in the Basketball Association of America (BAA), which merged with some of the better teams of  the National Basketball League to form the National Basketball Association in (NBA) in 1949. In the four years (1946–50) van Breda Kolff played in the BAA and the NBA, he
turned in a relatively unimpressive performance, shooting just .305 from the field, .669 from the line, and averaging 4.7 points in 175 contests. He was elected team captain of the Knicks.

After leaving the NBA in 1950, van Breda Kolff began a coaching career. He took over as head coach at Lafayette College, where he remained from 1951 to 1955. He also coached soccer and lacrosse at Lafayette. He then coached for Hofstra University from 1955 to 1962, and Princeton from 1962 to 1967. He is one of four men to have coached both an NCAA final Four team (Princeton, 1965) and an NBA Finals squad (the Los Angeles Lakers, 1968 and 1969). (The others are Larry Brown, Jack Ramsay, and Fred Schaus.)

Van Breda Kolff also spent time running a women's professional team and later coached a high school team in Picayune, Mississippi. "Coaching is coaching", he once told a reporter. "Give me 10 players who want to work and learn the game and I'm happy. I don't count the house."

Pro coaching career

Van Breda Kolff's success in college attracted the attention of the NBA. The Lakers hired him in 1967, and in his first season guided the team to the NBA Finals, where they lost to the Boston Celtics in six games. In his second campaign for the Lakers, his team — with Elgin Baylor, Jerry West, and Wilt Chamberlain — notched a 55–27 record and reached the Finals again, but van Breda Kolff and Chamberlain did not get along at all (the coach thought his star center was spoiled and openly favored Baylor and West over him, while Chamberlain viewed his coach as a loser and barely tolerated him). Van Breda Kolff took tremendous flak for not allowing Chamberlain back in the game for the final minutes of game 7 of the NBA finals against Boston. Chamberlain picked up his fifth foul midway through the fourth quarter, and shortly thereafter asked out of the game with knee pain. With backup center Mel Counts in the game, the Lakers cut a seven-point deficit to two points. Chamberlain then motioned to van Breda Kolff that he was ready to go back in the game, to which van Breda Kolff told him "sit your big ass down" and "we don't need you." The Lakers lost by two points, and van Breda Kolff resigned before he could be fired by Lakers owner Jack Kent Cooke. Game 7 marked the last time he would coach an NBA team in a postseason game.

Van Breda Kolff then went on to Detroit, where he coached the Pistons for just over two seasons. In 1970–71, he guided the team to a 45–37 mark, Detroit's first winning season in fifteen years. He left the team ten games into the next season, stating in a 1984 Sports Illustrated article that he quit after being cursed at repeatedly by frustrated fans. Van Breda Kolff coached the Phoenix Suns for the first seven games of the 1972–73 campaign before being fired and replaced by Jerry Colangelo. He did a stint with Memphis of the American Basketball Association in 1973–74. From 1974 to 1977, van Breda Kolff coached the New Orleans Jazz, taking over in the middle of the 1974–75 season and departing with a 14–12 record part way through the 1976–77 season.

While van Breda Kolff was coach, he pushed for New Orleans to relinquish the rights to Moses Malone in exchange for a #1 draft pick, and then traded that pick and two other #1s to the Lakers for Gail Goodrich. Malone would later become a superstar but Goodrich suffered an Achilles' tendon injury that would end his career in 1979. The Jazz' #1 pick in 1979 (the first overall choice) was used by the Lakers to select Magic Johnson. Breda Kolff left the NBA ranks for good in 1976, taking with him a career NBA coaching record of 266-253 and a .513 winning percentage. That also marked the year van Breda Kolff's son Jan entered the NBA, with the New York Nets; he coached one game against his son's team.

While in New Orleans, van Breda Kolff also coached the New Orleans Pride in the Women's Professional Basketball League (WBL) from 1979 to 1981.

In 1996, van Breda Kolff coached the Tampa Bay Windjammers for the first six games of the 1996 United States Basketball League (USBL) season.

Coaching style

Van Breda Kolff often clashed with other strong egos. After leaving the Jazz, he remained in New Orleans and returned to the college coaching ranks with the University of New Orleans, where he spent two years. In 1985, Lafayette, the team he had coached 30 years earlier, asked him to return. Van Breda Kolff stayed four seasons at Lafayette before leaving to coach Hofstra once again. His second stint with the Flying Dutchmen lasted five seasons and ended after the 1993–94 season. In 28 years as a college coach, he compiled a 482–272 record.

Death and legacy

Van Breda Kolff died August 22, 2007 at a nursing home in Spokane, Washington after a long illness.

"All I know is life isn't much different than that game on the court", he said in an article in the New York Daily News in the early 1980s. "If it's run right — with precision, with good, honest effort — it's a thing of beauty. I know what it looks like and that's what keeps me going."

His son Jan van Breda Kolff was also a basketball player and coach.

BAA/NBA career statistics

Regular season

Playoffs

Head coaching record

College basketball

NBA/ABA

|-
| align="left"|Los Angeles
| align="left"|
| 82 || 52 || 30 ||  || align="center"|2nd in Western|| 15 || 10 || 5 || 
| align="center"|Lost in NBA Finals
|-
| align="left"|Los Angeles
| align="left"|
| 82 || 55 || 27 ||  || align="center"|1st in Western|| 18 || 11 || 7 || 
| align="center"|Lost in NBA Finals
|-
| align="left"|Detroit
| align="left"|
| 82 || 31 || 51 ||  || align="center"|7th in Eastern || – || – || – || 
| align="center"|Missed Playoffs
|-
| align="left"|Detroit
| align="left"|
| 82 || 45 || 37 ||  || align="center"|4th in Midwest || – || – || – || 
| align="center"|Missed Playoffs
|-
| align="left"|Detroit
| align="left"|
| 10 || 6 || 4 ||  || align="center"|(resigned) || – || – || – || 
| align="center"|–
|-
| align="left"|Phoenix
| align="left"|
| 7 || 3 || 4 ||  || align="center"|(fired) || – || – || – || 
| align="center"|–
|- 
| align="left"|Memphis*
| align="left"|1973–74
| 84 || 21 || 63 ||  || align="center"|4th in Eastern || – || – || – || 
| align="center"|Missed Playoffs 
|-
| align="left"|New Orleans
| align="left"|
| 66 || 22 || 44 ||  || align="center"|5th in Central || – || – || – || 
| align="center"|Missed Playoffs
|-
| align="left"|New Orleans
| align="left"|
| 82 || 38 || 44 ||  || align="center"|4th in Central || – || – || – || 
| align="center"|Missed Playoffs
|-
| align="left"|New Orleans
| align="left"|
| 26 || 14 || 12 ||  || align="center"|(fired) || – || – || – || 
| align="center"|–
|- class="sortbottom"
| align="left"|Career
| || 603 || 287 || 316 ||  || || 33 || 21 || 12 ||  ||

See also
 List of NCAA Division I Men's Final Four appearances by coach

References

1922 births
2007 deaths
American men's basketball coaches
American men's basketball players
American people of Dutch descent
Basketball coaches from New Jersey
Basketball players from New Jersey
College men's basketball head coaches in the United States
Detroit Pistons head coaches
The Hill School alumni
Hofstra Pride men's basketball coaches
Lafayette College faculty
Lafayette Leopards men's basketball coaches
Lafayette Leopards men's lacrosse coaches
Lafayette Leopards men's soccer coaches
Los Angeles Lakers head coaches
Memphis Sounds coaches
New Orleans Jazz head coaches
New Orleans Privateers men's basketball coaches
New York Knicks players
NYU Violets men's basketball players
People from Glen Ridge, New Jersey
People from Montclair, New Jersey
Phoenix Suns head coaches
Princeton Tigers men's basketball coaches
Princeton Tigers men's basketball players
Princeton Tigers men's soccer players
Shooting guards
Small forwards
Sportspeople from Essex County, New Jersey
United States Basketball League coaches
Wilkes-Barre Barons players
Association footballers not categorized by position
Association football players not categorized by nationality
Women's Professional Basketball League coaches